Lieutenant-Colonel Edward Elers Delaval Henderson VC (2 October 1878 – 25 January 1917) was a British recipient of the Victoria Cross, the highest and most prestigious award for gallantry in the face of the enemy that can be awarded to British and Commonwealth forces.

Early life
Henderson was educated at Dunstable Grammar School. He joined the West India Regiment as Second lieutenant on 15 December 1900, and was seconded for service with the Northern Nigeria Regiment, West African Frontier Force. He was promoted to Lieutenant on 10 February 1902.

Victoria cross action
He was 38 years old, and a major and acting lieutenant colonel in The North Staffordshire Regiment (The Prince of Wales's), British Army, attached to The Royal Warwickshire Regiment, commanding 9th Battalion during the First World War. On 25 January 1917 on the west bank of the River Hai, near Kut, Mesopotamia, he performed the deed for which he was awarded the Victoria Cross.

He was buried in the Amara War Cemetery.

The Medal
His VC is on display in the Lord Ashcroft Gallery at the Imperial War Museum, London.

See also
 Robert Edwin Phillips.

References

 Victoria Cross.org

1878 births
1917 deaths
North Staffordshire Regiment officers
British Army personnel of World War I
British World War I recipients of the Victoria Cross
British military personnel killed in World War I
People from Shimla
British Army recipients of the Victoria Cross
Military personnel from Himachal Pradesh
Military personnel of British India
West India Regiment officers
British people in colonial India